The Mount Washington Hotel is a hotel in Bretton Woods, New Hampshire, United States, near Mount Washington. It was designed by Charles Alling Gifford. In 1944, it hosted the Bretton Woods Conference, which established the International Monetary Fund and the World Bank.

The area, part of the town of Carroll, New Hampshire, includes the Bretton Woods ski resort nearby.

In December 2015, the hotel and the Bretton Woods Mountain Resort were purchased by Omni Mount Washington LLC from the CNL Financial Group, of Orlando, Florida, and will continue to be operated by Omni Hotels & Resorts under the official name of Omni Mount Washington Resort. It is a member of Historic Hotels of America, the official program of the National Trust for Historic Preservation.

History
The hotel was constructed between 1900 and 1902 at a cost of $1.7 million (approximately $ million today) by Joseph Stickney, a native of Concord, New Hampshire who had made a fortune before the age of 30 as a coal broker in Pennsylvania. In 1881 Stickney and his partner, John N. Conyngham, had purchased the nearby Mount Pleasant Hotel (a large early hotel demolished in 1939) from lumberman John T.G. Leavitt. Subsequently, Stickney began work on his Mount Washington Hotel. He had envisioned the hotel to be a luxurious getaway for urban dwellers looking to escape the city.

Stickney brought in 250 Italian artisans to build it, particularly the granite and stucco masonry. Construction started in 1900 on the Y-shaped hotel, which opened on July 28, 1902. At its completion, the hotel boasted over 2,000 doors, 12,000 windows, and over eleven miles of plumbing.

At the opening ceremony, Stickney told the audience, "Look at me, gentlemen ... for I am the poor fool who built all this!" Within a year he was dead at the age of 64 due to a heart attack.

His wife, Carolyn Stickney, spent her summers at the hotel for the next decade, adding the Sun Dining Room with guest rooms above, the fourth floor between the towers, and the chapel honoring her late husband. Under its capable first manager, John Anderson, the hotel was a success. But the advent of income tax, Prohibition, and the Great Depression curtailed the hospitality business. In 1936, Mrs. Stickney's nephew, Foster Reynolds, inherited the hotel, but it closed in 1942 because of World War II. In 1944, a Boston syndicate bought the extensive property for about $450,000. The Bretton Woods monetary conference took place that year, establishing the World Bank and the International Monetary Fund. The owners were paid $300,000 for the loss of business and promised a daily room charge of $18 per person for the 19-day conference. Subsequently, each bedroom carried a plaque outside its door identifying which country's representative at that conference had stayed in that room.

The Mount Washington Hotel and Resort is one of the last surviving grand hotels in the White Mountains and includes an 18-hole Donald Ross-designed golf course, as well as the hotel's original 9-hole course designed by A.H. Findlay.

It was declared a National Historic Landmark in 1986.

The hotel opened for its first winter season in 1999. Before that year the hotel would close to guests late in the fall and open in the spring. The entire hotel was overhauled before the winter, with efficient windows installed in the entire hotel.

In January 2009 the Mount Washington Resort completed a  addition that includes a  spa and a  conference center.

In November 2010 it was revealed that the hotel's then-owner, CNL, had sought to trademark the Mount Washington name, which upset area business owners.  CNL said they were just directing their efforts against other hotels in the area that have the mountain's name and not other businesses that also have it.

Culture
The hotel was featured in two episodes of the television series Ghost Hunters, when it was searched by the TAPS paranormal investigation team on February 6, 2008.

There is a popular urban legend that the Mount Washington Hotel served as inspiration for the Overlook Hotel in Stephen King's novel The Shining (1977) and the subsequent film adaptation. King is a native of nearby Maine and has set several of his novels in New Hampshire. Regardless, King and the Mount Washington Hotel themselves have discredited this legend, with King stating the hotel was based off The Stanley Hotel in Estes Park, Colorado. Regardless, the legend persists, even being included in the Condé Nest Travelers video "50 People Tell Us The Best Movies & TV Shows Set in Their States".

Omni Bretton Arms Inn

The Omni Bretton Arms Inn' is a hotel in the larger resort which was built as a house in 1896.  The Bretton Arms served as staff housing for many years.

It has been separately named to the Historic Hotels of America program of the National Trust for Historic Preservation.

See also

 List of Historic Hotels of America
List of National Historic Landmarks in New Hampshire
National Register of Historic Places listings in Coos County, New Hampshire

References

External links

 Omni Mount Washington Resort — official website
 Virtual tour of the Mount Washington Hotel at historic-hotels-lodges.com
 "The Grand Hotels, the Glory and the Conflagration" at WhiteMountainHistory.org
 Historic Print Shop on the site described by Rick Russack, earmarked for restoration

Hotels in New Hampshire
Historic Hotels of America
Hotel buildings completed in 1902
Golf clubs and courses designed by Donald Ross
National Historic Landmarks in New Hampshire
Buildings and structures in Coös County, New Hampshire
Reportedly haunted locations in New Hampshire
Hotel buildings on the National Register of Historic Places in New Hampshire
Tourist attractions in Coös County, New Hampshire
National Register of Historic Places in Coös County, New Hampshire
Carroll, New Hampshire
1902 establishments in New Hampshire